Krzysztof is a Polish given name, equivalent to English Christopher. The name became popular in the 15th century. Its diminutive forms include Krzyś, Krzysiek, and Krzysio; augmentative – Krzychu

Individuals named Krzysztof may choose to celebrate their name day on March 15, July 25, March 2, May 21, August 20 or October 31.

People with the first name Krzysztof 
 Krzysztof Arciszewski (1592–1656), Polish military man
 Krzysztof Bednarski (born 1953), famous contemporary Polish sculptor
 Krzysztof Bizacki (born 1973), Polish footballer
 Krzysztof Bukalski (born 1970), Polish footballer
 Krzysztof Charamsa (born 1972), Polish priest
 Krzysztof Chodkiewicz, d. 1652, Polish-Lithuanian nobleman
 Krzysztof Cwalina (born 1971), Polish freestyle swimmer
 Krzysztof Czerwinski (Krzysztof Czerwiński) (born 1980), Polish conductor, organist and voice teacher
 Krzysztof Dabrowski (Krzysztof Dąbrowski) (born 1978), Polish footballer
 Krzysztof Głowacki (born 1986), Polish boxer
 Krzysztof Grzymułtowski (1620–1687), Polish voivod of Poznań Voivodship, diplomat and member of Polish sejm
 Krzysztof Hołowczyc (born 1962), Polish rally driver
 Krzysztof Kamil Baczyński (1921–1944), code-name Jan Bugaj, Polish poet
  (born 1939), Polish poet, translator and musicologist
 Krzysztof Kciuk (born 1980), Polish darts player
 Krzysztof Kieślowski (1941–1996), film director
 Krzysztof Klabon (c. 1550 – c. 1616), Polish Renaissance composer, lutenist, and singer.
 Krzysztof Komeda (born Krzysztof Trzciński) (1931–1969), Polish film music composer and jazz pianist
 Krzysztof Kosiński (died 1593) Polish noble
 Krzysztof Krawczyk (singer) (1946–2021), Polish pop singer
 Krzysztof Krawczyk (athlete) (born 1962), Polish high jumper
 Krzysztof Król (born 1987), Polish footballer
 Krzysztof Mikołaj Piorun Radziwiłł (1547–1603), nicknamed The Thunderbolt, Reichsfürst of the Holy Roman Empire and a Polish-Lithuanian noble
 Krzysztof Nowak (1975–2005), Polish football player
 Krzysztof Oliwa (born 1973), former ice hockey player
 Krzysztof Opaliński (1609–1655), Polish-Lithuanian Commonwealth noble, politician and writer
 Krzysztof Ossoliński (1587–1645), Polish-Lithuanian szlachcic (nobleman)
 Krzysztof Penderecki (1933–2020), Polish composer and conductor of classical music
 Krzysztof Piątek (born 1995),  Polish professional footballer 
 Krzysztof Piesiewicz (born 1945), Polish lawyer, screenwriter, and politician
 Krzysztof Radziwiłł (1585–1640), Polish-Lithuanian noble and magnate
 Krzysztof Ratajski (born 1977), Polish darts player
 Krzysztof Skiba aka Skiba (born 1964), Polish musician, songwriter, satirist, essayist and actor
 Krzysztof Soszynski (born 1977), Polish-Canadian professional mixed martial artist
 Krzysztof Szydłowiecki (1467–1532), Polish noble
 Krzysztof Warlikowski (born 1962), Polish theatre and opera director
 Krzysztof Warzycha (born 1964), Polish footballer nicknamed 'Gucio'
 Krzysztof Włodarczyk, Polish boxer
 Krzysztof Wielicki (born 1950), Polish mountaineer
 Krzysztof Wiesiołowski, d. 1637, Polish szlachcic
 Krzysztof Wodiczko, an artist currently living in Boston
 Krzysztof Zanussi (born 1939), Polish producer and film director
 Krzysztof Zbaraski (1580–1627), a Polish noble
 Krzysztof Zygmunt Pac (1621–1684), Chancellor of the Grand Duchy of Lithuania

People with the middle name Krzysztof 
 Mikołaj Krzysztof "Sierotka" Radziwiłł
 Wladyslaw Krzysztof Grabinski, son of Stanisław Bohdan Grabiński
 Jan Krzysztof Bielecki (born May 3, 1951)

See also 

 Polish name

Polish masculine given names